Lee Dennice Alimagno Villamor (born July 1, 1990) is a Filipino professional basketball player who is a mainstay of Barangay Ginebra San Miguel 3x3. He also played for the Batangas Tanduay Athletics of the Maharlika Pilipinas Basketball League (MPBL). He was drafted as a 28th overall pick by the Barangay Ginebra San Miguel in the 2015 PBA draft.

References

External links

1990 births
Living people
Barangay Ginebra San Miguel players
Basketball players from Laguna (province)
Filipino men's basketball players
People from San Pablo, Laguna
Power forwards (basketball)
NU Bulldogs basketball players
Maharlika Pilipinas Basketball League players
Barangay Ginebra San Miguel draft picks
Filipino men's 3x3 basketball players
PBA 3x3 players